is a Japanese professional Go player.

Biography
Shinichi is the older brother of female 8 dan go player, Kikuyo Aoki. He studied under Yasuro Kikuchi. He has over 400 wins as a professional in his career.

Titles

References

1965 births
Japanese Go players
Living people